This is a list of ghost towns in Illinois.

List

 Anderson, Macoupin County
 Appleton
 Barr, Macoupin County
 Benjaminville
 Bethel
 Bourbonais
 Brownsville
 Brush Point
 Bybee
 Caledonia, Putnam County
 Cardiff
 Cayuga
 Challacombe
 Chamness
 Civer
 Clayville
 Clifford Eight
 Coltonville
 Comer
 Crawfordsville
 Daggett
 Dutton
 Elm Point
 Elton
 Enos
 Evans
 Fillmore, Douglas County
 Fremont
 Green Rock
 Greenridge, Macoupin County
 Griffin
 Griggsville Landing
 Gurney
 Hagaman
 Half Day, Lake County
 Halfway
 Halfway (Little Juarez)
 Henpeck, Kane County
 Horace
 Jugtown (now part of Goose Lake Prairie State Natural Area)
 Kumler
 Ledford
 Lemmon
 Lexington, Edwards County
 Little Rock, LaSalle County
 Macoupin
 McVey
 Midway, Fulton County
 Miles Station
 Mills Prairie
 Millsdale
 Millville
 Milton, Brown County
 Morse
 Ocoya
 Old Evansville
 Old Westville
 Orchard Place
 Oxford
 Palmyra, Edwards County
 Papsville
 Parker City
 Piankashawtown
 Reeders
 Reeds Crossing
 Riverview
 Rodden
 Santa Fe Park
 Schoper
 Shasta
 Shirley
 Sugarville
 Sylvan
 Tacaogane
 Tedens
 Totten Prairie
 Tracy
 Tuscumbia
 Vishnu Springs
 Wanborough
 Weston, DuPage County
 Whistleville (now site of Fort Daniel Conservation Area)
 White Oak Springs
 Wilson, Lake County

References

Illinois geography-related lists
Illinois